David Ryan Stras (born July 4, 1974) is a United States circuit judge of the United States Court of Appeals for the Eighth Circuit. He is a former Associate Justice of the Minnesota Supreme Court.

Early life and education
Stras was born in 1974 in Wichita, Kansas. He graduated from the University of Kansas in 1995 with a Bachelor of Arts with highest honors. He then jointly attended the University of Kansas's School of Law and School of Business, receiving a JD–MBA in 1999. As a law student, Stras was editor-in-chief of the Criminal Procedure Edition of the Kansas Law Review, and he received his law degree with Order of the Coif honors.

Legal career
Stras was a law clerk for judge Melvin Brunetti of the U.S. Court of Appeals for the Ninth Circuit from 1999 to 2000, then for judge J. Michael Luttig of the U.S. Court of Appeals for the Fourth Circuit from 2000 to 2001. After spending a year in private practice at the Washington, D.C. office of Sidley Austin, Stras then clerked for justice Clarence Thomas of the U.S. Supreme Court from 2002 to 2003.

Stras was a fellow at the University of Alabama School of Law from 2003 to 2004. From 2004 to 2010, Stras was a professor of law at the University of Minnesota Law School, teaching and writing in the areas of federal courts and jurisdiction, constitutional law, criminal law, and law and politics. He won the law school's Stanley V. Kinyon Tenure Track Teacher of the Year Award in 2006. While he was on the faculty of  University of Minnesota Law School, he was also a counsel at Faegre & Bensen. Stras also served as co-director of the Institute for Law and Politics. He has contributed to research on such topics as judicial pensions and life tenure for judges. Stras has also studied judicial appointments and the politics of courts. He is a member of the Federalist Society.

Stras was appointed to the Minnesota Supreme Court by Governor Tim Pawlenty, with his term beginning on July 1, 2010. He was sworn in on July 12, 2010, in a public ceremony. Stras was elected to a six-year term in 2012. Prior to his appointment, he was a frequent guest on legal topics at Minnesota Public Radio. He is believed to be the first practicing Jewish justice on the Minnesota Supreme Court. He was on President Donald Trump's list of potential Supreme Court justices.

Federal judicial service

Nomination and confirmation 
On May 8, 2017, President Donald Trump nominated Stras to a seat on the United States Court of Appeals for the Eighth Circuit vacated by Judge Diana E. Murphy, who assumed senior status on November 29, 2016. On September 5, 2017, Minnesota Senator Al Franken announced that he would not return his blue slip for Stras. On November 29, 2017, a hearing was held on his nomination before the Senate Judiciary Committee.

On January 3, 2018, his nomination was returned to the President under Rule XXXI, Paragraph 6 of the United States Senate. On January 5, 2018, Trump announced his intent to renominate Stras to a federal judgeship. On January 8, 2018, his renomination was sent to the Senate. On January 18, 2018, his nomination was reported out of committee by a 13–8 vote. On January 29, 2018, the Senate invoked cloture on his nomination by a 57–41 vote. On January 30, 2018, David Stras's nomination was confirmed by the Senate by a 56–42 vote. He received his judicial commission on January 31, 2018.

Notable opinions 
On August 23, 2018, Stras wrote a concurring opinion in a case challenging the Federal Housing Finance Agency's ability to hold Fannie Mae and Freddie Mac in conservatorship and require that they pay their entire net worth to the United States Treasury every quarter. Stras argued that, while the statutory provision giving the FHFA such power was textually clear, Congress had "created a monster by handing an agency breathtakingly broad powers and insulating the exercise of those powers from judicial review."

On August 23, 2019, Stras wrote an opinion for the Eighth Circuit ruling in favor of a Christian videography business challenging Minnesota's public accommodations law under the First Amendment. The Eighth Circuit found that the business owners could not be penalized for refusing to produce wedding videos of same-sex marriages. Stras noted that forcing the business owners to produce the videos would be a form of compelled speech, and was thus prohibited under the Free Exercise Clause.

On November 6, 2019, Stras wrote a concurring opinion in a case challenging an Arkansas anti-loitering statute. Stras argued that the statewide injunction originally issued by the federal district court was an unjustified "universal preliminary injunction." According to Stras, the history of injunctions in equity practice strongly suggests that injunctive relief, outside of class actions, should be limited to the parties before the court.

On November 20, 2021, Stras issued a sharply worded dissent criticizing the panel majority for relying on the North Dakota Department of Public Health's interpretation of a Clean Air Act regulation issued by the Environmental Protection Agency. Stras argued that a state agency did not have the power to interpret a federal regulation and pointed out that deferring to such interpretations would harm separation of powers and federalism by giving interpretive authority to state executive officials, rather than federal judges properly situated to determine the meaning of federal law. On June 1, 2021, the Eighth Circuit issued a new opinion which directly interpreted the federal regulation. Stras, again dissenting, hailed the majority for properly exercising "independent judgment" rather than deferring to the state agency's view, but also argued that the panel majority nonetheless did not interpret the regulatory text correctly.

On July 30, 2021, Stras dissented from the Eighth Circuit's ruling that members of a St. Louis church lacked standing to challenge a county public health order restricting the size of religious gatherings in response to the COVID-19 pandemic. Stras argued that the Eighth Circuit's decision to dismiss the case "lock[ed] and deadbolt[ed] the courthouse door for a group of plaintiffs trying to challenge a stay-at-home order that specifically targeted “religious services and other spiritual practices.” Stras criticized the Eighth Circuit for failing to address the county's orders in a timely fashion, suggesting that the county would continue to issue orders burdening religious practice and that the Eighth Circuit's inaction would harm "important constitutional values."

Personal life
Stras and his wife, Heather, have two children. His grandmother is a Holocaust survivor from Hungary and his grandfather is a Holocaust survivor from Germany.

Electoral history
2012

See also

 List of law clerks of the Supreme Court of the United States (Seat 10)
 List of Jewish American jurists
 List of justices of the Minnesota Supreme Court
 List of first minority male lawyers and judges in Minnesota
 Donald Trump judicial appointment controversies
 Donald Trump Supreme Court candidates

References

External links

 
 
 Tribute, Distinguished Scholar, Dedicated Teacher, and now Justice: David R. Stras
 Published articles on various legal topics
 On Minnesota Supreme Court David Stras found unlikely allies – MPR News – Newscut Blog – Bob Collins May 18, 2016
 

|-

1974 births
Living people
20th-century American lawyers
21st-century American lawyers
21st-century American judges
American legal scholars
American legal writers
Federalist Society members
Jewish American attorneys
Judges of the United States Court of Appeals for the Eighth Circuit
Law clerks of the Supreme Court of the United States
Lawyers from Washington, D.C.
Minnesota lawyers
Justices of the Minnesota Supreme Court
People from Wichita, Kansas
United States court of appeals judges appointed by Donald Trump
University of Iowa College of Law faculty
University of Kansas alumni
University of Minnesota Law School faculty
Law clerks of J. Michael Luttig